Adele Stürzl (November 23, 1892 – June 30, 1944) was an Austrian communist and resistance fighter against National Socialism.

Life 
Stürzl was born in Vienna, her parents were originally from South Bohemia near Znojmo. She worked as a maid in her youth. In Vienna she came into contact with the Social Democratic workers movement. In Budapest, she met her husband. Together, the couple moved to Kufstein in Tyrol after World War I had ended in May 1918.

In Kufstein, Adele Stürzl was an activist for labour rights. She managed for female workers in an arms factory to get a raise. She was an active member of the Social Democratic Party and then the Communist Party. When the Communist Party was prohibited in 1933, she was arrested for a short time. She was again arrested in 1934 and 1935.

After Austria became annexed to Nazi Germany, she was active in the resistance against the regime. She collaborated with other resistance fighters around the Robert Uhrig group, they regularly met also at her house. She was arrested in June 1942. She was suspected of trying to bring a deserter out of the country to Switzerland in April 1942. For May 1, 1942 she tried to organise a hunger demonstration of housewives at the main square in Kufstein. In November 1942, Stürzl was convicted in Innsbruck of helping a deserter and sentenced to four years in prison. On April 14, 1944, she was sentenced to death by the People's Court.

Probably on June 30, 1944 (some sources mention August 16, 1944), she was executed in Stadelheim Prison in Munich.

Remembrance 
A small street in Kufstein was named after her: Adele-Stürzl-Weg.

References 

1892 births
1944 deaths
Communist Party of Austria politicians
Social Democratic Party of Austria politicians
People condemned by Nazi courts
Executed communists in the German Resistance
People executed by Nazi Germany by guillotine
People from Kufstein
Austrian communists
20th-century Austrian women
19th-century Austrian women
Austrian people executed by Nazi Germany